Phyllobrostis kandaharensis is a moth in the Lyonetiidae family. It is only known from Kandahar in Afghanistan.

The wingspan is 5.2-6.2 mm.

External links
Revision of the genus Phyllobrostis Staudinger, 1859 (Lepidoptera, Lyonetiidae)

Lyonetiidae
Moths described in 2006